Lamprocheila is a genus of beetles in the family Buprestidae, containing the following species:

 Lamprocheila maillei (Laporte & Gory, 1835)
 Lamprocheila splendida Akiyama, 1993

References

Buprestidae genera